Lee Jun-ho (born 22 October 1995) is a South Korean male artistic gymnast who represented South Korea at the 2020 Summer Olympics in Tokyo, Japan.

References

External links 
 

1995 births
Living people
South Korean male artistic gymnasts
Gymnasts from Seoul
Asian Games medalists in gymnastics
Gymnasts at the 2018 Asian Games
Asian Games bronze medalists for South Korea
Medalists at the 2018 Asian Games
Universiade medalists in gymnastics
Universiade silver medalists for South Korea
Medalists at the 2015 Summer Universiade
Gymnasts at the 2020 Summer Olympics
Olympic gymnasts of South Korea
21st-century South Korean people